United Nations Security Council resolution 1420, adopted unanimously on 30 June 2002, after recalling all previous resolutions on the conflict in the former Yugoslavia, particularly resolutions 1357 (2001) and 1418 (2002), the council, acting under Chapter VII of the United Nations Charter, extended the mandate of the United Nations Mission in Bosnia and Herzegovina (UNMIBH) and authorised the continuation of the Stabilisation Force until 3 July 2002.

The resolution, sponsored by France, Republic of Ireland, Norway and the United Kingdom, was adopted following a veto of a previous draft resolution by the United States extending UNMIBH's mandate until the end of 2002. The veto was imposed after concerns regarding the entry into force of the Rome Statute of the International Criminal Court on 1 July 2002 and its ability to prosecute personnel from nations not party to the Statute, of which the United States was not party to.

See also
 Bosnian War
 List of United Nations Security Council Resolutions 1401 to 1500 (2002–2003)
 Yugoslav Wars

References

External links
 
Text of the Resolution at undocs.org

 1420
2002 in Bosnia and Herzegovina
 1420
June 2002 events